Mikhail Sokolovsky may refer to:

 Mikhail Sokolovsky (composer) (1756 - 1795), Russian composer and conductor
 Mykhaylo Sokolovsky (b. 1951), Soviet footballer and Ukrainian coach